Hugh Ellis Hill (July 21, 1879 – September 6, 1958) was a Major League Baseball outfielder who played for two seasons. He played for the Cleveland Naps during the 1903 Cleveland Naps season and the St. Louis Cardinals during the 1904 St. Louis Cardinals season. Hill spent a few quality seasons with the American Association's Kansas City Blues prior to 1910. He is buried at the Spring Hill Cemetery in Charleston, West Virginia.

External links

1879 births
1958 deaths
Burials at Spring Hill Cemetery (Charleston, West Virginia)
Cleveland Naps players
St. Louis Cardinals players
Major League Baseball outfielders
Nashville Vols players
Kansas City Cowboys (minor league) players
Kansas City Blues (baseball) players
Buffalo Bisons (minor league) players
Mobile Sea Gulls players
New Orleans Pelicans (baseball) players
San Antonio Bronchos players
Baseball players from Georgia (U.S. state)
People from Ringgold, Georgia
burials in West Virginia